Hebei Township is a township under the administration of Shuncheng District, Fushun, Liaoning, China. , it administers Dishuiwan Residential Community and the following fourteen villages:
Donghua Village
Fangxiao Village
Liren Village
Liandao Village
Gujiazi Village
Huangqi Village
Sijiazi Village
Gongjia Village
Beiguan New Village
Xinqu Village
Xige Village
Yingshi Village
Gebu Village
Oujia Village

References 

Township-level divisions of Liaoning
Fushun